The Tata Steel Chess Tournament 2021 was the 83rd edition of the Tata Steel Chess Tournament. It was held in Wijk aan Zee, Netherlands from 15-31 January 2021, but was not open to visitors ("online only"). The tournament was won by Jorden van Foreest, who defeated Anish Giri in an Armageddon playoff.

Results

Results by round

Standings
{| class="wikitable" style="text-align: center;"
|+83rd Tata Steel Masters, 15–31 January 2021, Wijk aan Zee, Netherlands, Category XIX (2725)
! !! Player !! Rating !! 1 !! 2 !! 3 !! 4 !! 5 !! 6 !! 7 !! 8 !! 9 !! 10 !! 11 !! 12 !! 13 !! 14 !! Total 
!TB
! SB !! TPR
|-style="background:#ccffcc;"
| 1 || align="left" ||| 2671
|
|½
|½
|½
|½
|½
|1
|1
|1
|½
|1
|½
|½
|½
|8½
|1+
|53.00
|2839
|-
| 2 || align="left" ||| 2764
|½
| 
|½
|½
|½
|½
|½
|1
|1
|½
|½
|1
|1
|½
|8½
|1
|52.25
|2832
|-
| 3 || align="left" ||| 2677
|½
|½
| 
|½
|½
|1
|½
|0
|½
|½
|1
|1
|½
|1
|8
|
|49.00
|2815
|-
| 4 || align="left" ||| 2823
|½
|½
|½
| 
|½
|½
|½
|½
|½
|½
|½
|1
|1
|1
|8
|
|48.25
|2804
|-
| 5 || align="left" | || 2749
|½
|½
|½
|½
| 
|0
|1
|½
|½
|1
|1
|½
|½
|1
|8
|
|48.00
|2810
|-
| 6 || align="left" ||| 2862
|½
|½
|0
|½
|1
| 
|½
|½
|1
|½
|½
|½
|1
|½
|7½
|
|47.25
|2771
|-
| 7 || align="left" ||| 2732
|0
|½
|½
|½
|0
|½
| 
|½
|1
|½
|½
|½
|½
|1
|6½
|
|38.75
|2724
|-
| 8 || align="left" ||| 2625
|0
|0
|1
|½
|½
|½
|½
| 
|½
|½
|½
|½
|½
|½
|6
|
|38.00
|2703
|-
| 9 || align="left" ||| 2663
|0
|0
|½
|½
|½
|0
|0
|½
| 
|1
|½
|½
|1
|1
|6
|
|34.00
|2700
|-
| 10 || align="left" ||| 2743
|½
|½
|½
|½
|0
|½
|½
|½
|0
| 
|½
|½
|½
|½
|5½
|
|35.75
|2666
|-
| 11 || align="left" ||| 2679
|0
|½
|0
|½
|0
|½
|½
|½
|½
|½
| 
|½
|½
|½
|5
|
|30.75
|2641
|-
| 12 || align="left" ||| 2705
|½
|0
|0
|0
|½
|½
|½
|½
|½
|½
|½
| 
|½
|½
|5
|
|30.75
|2639
|-
| 13 || align="left" ||| 2784
|½
|0
|½
|0
|½
|0
|½
|½
|0
|½
|½
|½
| 
|1
|5
|
|29.75
|2633
|-
| 14 || align="left" ||| 2668
|½
|½
|0
|0
|0
|½
|0
|½
|0
|½
|½
|½
|0
| 
|3½
|
|23.00
|2554
|}

Masters results by round
Pairings and results:

 

{| class="wikitable" style="font-size: 90%"
|-
|colspan=7 style="background:#cccccc;" | Round 1 – 16 January 2021
|-
| Pentala Harikrishna || Maxime Vachier-Lagrave ||align=center width="30px"| ½–½ 
|-
| Radosław Wojtaszek || David Antón Guijarro ||align=center | ½–½ 
|-
| Magnus Carlsen || Alireza Firouzja ||align=center | 1–0 
|-
| Andrey Esipenko || Jan-Krzysztof Duda ||align=center | ½–½ 
|-
| Nils Grandelius || Alexander Donchenko ||align=center | 1–0 
|-
| Fabiano Caruana || Jorden van Foreest ||align=center | ½–½ 
|-
| Anish Giri || Aryan Tari ||align=center | 1–0 
|-
|colspan=7 style="background:#cccccc;" | Round 2 – 17 January 2021
|-
| Pentala Harikrishna (½) || Andrey Esipenko (½) ||align=center width="30px"| ½–½ 
|-
| Jorden van Foreest (½) || Anish Giri (1) ||align=center | ½–½ 
|-
| Jan-Krzysztof Duda (½) || Nils Grandelius (1) ||align=center | 0-1  
|-
| Alexander Donchenko (0) || Fabiano Caruana (½) ||align=center | 0–1 
|-
| Maxime Vachier-Lagrave (½) || Alireza Firouzja (0) ||align=center | ½–½  
|-
| David Antón Guijarro (½) || Magnus Carlsen (1) ||align=center | ½–½  
|-
| Aryan Tari (0) || Radosław Wojtaszek (½) ||align=center | ½–½  
|-
|colspan=7 style="background:#cccccc;" | Round 3 – 18 January 2021
|-
| Magnus Carlsen (1½) || Aryan Tari (½) ||align=center | ½–½   
|-
| Radosław Wojtaszek (1) || Jorden van Foreest (1) ||align=center | ½–½ 
|-
| Fabiano Caruana (1½) || Jan-Krzysztof Duda (½) ||align=center | ½–½ 
|-
| Nils Grandelius (2) || Pentala Harikrishna (1) ||align=center | 0–1 
|-
| Anish Giri (1½) || Alexander Donchenko (0) ||align=center | ½–½ 
|-
| Andrey Esipenko (1) || Maxime Vachier-Lagrave (1) ||align=center | ½–½ 
|-
| Alireza Firouzja (½) || David Antón Guijarro (1) ||align=center | 1–0 
|-
|colspan=7 style="background:#cccccc;" | Round 4 – 19 January 2021
|-
| Aryan Tari (1) || Alireza Firouzja (1½) ||align=center | ½–½ 
|-
| Jan-Krzysztof Duda (1) || Anish Giri (2) ||align=center | ½–½  
|-
| Andrey Esipenko (1½) || Nils Grandelius (2) ||align=center | ½–½  
|-
| Pentala Harikrishna (2) || Fabiano Caruana (2) ||align=center | ½–½ 
|-
| Alexander Donchenko (½) || Radosław Wojtaszek (1½) ||align=center | ½–½ 
|-
| Maxime Vachier-Lagrave (1½) || David Antón Guijarro (1) ||align=center | ½–½  
|-
| Jorden van Foreest (1½) || Magnus Carlsen (2) ||align=center | ½–½ 
|-
|colspan=7 style="background:#cccccc;" | Round 5 – 21 January 2021
|-
| Alireza Firouzja (2) || Jorden van Foreest (2) ||align=center | ½–½  
|-
| David Antón Guijarro (1½) || Aryan Tari (1½) ||align=center |  ½–½  
|-
| Anish Giri (2½) || Pentala Harikrishna (2½) ||align=center | ½–½ 
|-
| Fabiano Caruana (2½) || Andrey Esipenko (2) ||align=center | ½–½ 
|-
| Magnus Carlsen (2½) || Alexander Donchenko (1) ||align=center | ½–½  
|-
| Nils Grandelius (2½) || Maxime Vachier-Lagrave (2) ||align=center |  1–0 
|-
| Radosław Wojtaszek (2) || Jan-Krzysztof Duda (1½) ||align=center | ½–½ 
|-
|colspan=7 style="background:#cccccc;" | Round 6 – 22 January 2021
|-
|  (1½) || Alireza Firouzja (2½) ||align=center | 0–1   
|-
| Jorden van Foreest (2½) || David Antón Guijarro (2) ||align=center | 1–0  
|-
| Nils Grandelius (3½) || Fabiano Caruana (3) ||align=center | ½–½
|-
| Pentala Harikrishna (3) || Radosław Wojtaszek (2½) ||align=center | ½–½
|-
| Andrey Esipenko (2½) || Anish Giri (3) ||align=center | ½–½ 
|-
| Jan-Krzysztof Duda (2) || Magnus Carlsen (3) ||align=center | ½–½ 
|-
| Maxime Vachier-Lagrave (2) || Aryan Tari (2) ||align=center | ½–½  
|-
|colspan=7 style="background:#cccccc;" | Round 7 – 23 January 2021
|-
| David Antón Guijarro (2) || Alexander Donchenko (1½) ||align=center | ½–½  
|-
| Aryan Tari (2½) || Jorden van Foreest (3½) ||align=center | 0–1
|-
| Fabiano Caruana (3½) || Maxime Vachier-Lagrave (2½) ||align=center | 1–0 
|-
| Anish Giri (3½) || Nils Grandelius (4) ||align=center | 1–0 
|-
| Magnus Carlsen (3½) || Pentala Harikrishna (3½) ||align=center | ½–½ 
|-
| Alireza Firouzja (3½) || Jan-Krzysztof Duda (2½) ||align=center | 1–0  
|-
| Radosław Wojtaszek (3) ||  (3) ||align=center | 0–1  
|-
|}

{| class="wikitable" style="font-size: 90%"
|-
|colspan=7 style="background:#cccccc;" | Round 8 – 24 January 2021
|-
| Alexander Donchenko (2) || Aryan Tari (2½) ||align=center width="30px" | ½–½ 
|-
| Pentala Harikrishna (4) || Alireza Firouzja (4½) ||align=center | 0–1 
|-
| Maxime Vachier-Lagrave (2½) || Jorden van Foreest (4½) ||align=center | ½–½ 
|-
| Fabiano Caruana (4½) || Anish Giri (4½) ||align=center | ½–½
|-
| Nils Grandelius (4) || Radosław Wojtaszek (3) ||align=center | ½–½ 
|-
| Jan-Krzysztof Duda (2½) || David Antón Guijarro (2½) ||align=center | ½–½ 
|-
| Andrey Esipenko (4) || Magnus Carlsen (4) ||align=center | 1–0 
|-
|colspan=7 style="background:#cccccc;" | Round 9 – 26 January 2021
|-
| Radosław Wojtaszek (3½) || Fabiano Caruana (5) ||align=center |  0–1
|-
| Alireza Firouzja (5½) || Andrey Esipenko (5) ||align=center | ½–½  
|-
| David Antón Guijarro (3) || Pentala Harikrishna (4) ||align=center |  ½–½ 
|-
| Anish Giri (5) || Maxime Vachier-Lagrave (3) ||align=center | 1–0
|-
| Jorden van Foreest (5) || Alexander Donchenko (2½) ||align=center | ½–½ 
|-
| Magnus Carlsen (4) || Nils Grandelius (4½) ||align=center | 1–0 
|-
| Aryan Tari (3) || Jan-Krzysztof Duda (3) ||align=center | ½–½
|-
|colspan=7 style="background:#cccccc;" | Round 10 – 27 January 2021
|-
| Fabiano Caruana (6) || Magnus Carlsen (5) ||align=center | ½–½ 
|-
| Jan-Krzysztof Duda (3½) || Jorden van Foreest (5½) ||align=center | ½–½ 
|-
| Pentala Harikrishna (4½) || Aryan Tari (3½) ||align=center | ½–½
|-
| Andrey Esipenko (5½) || David Antón Guijarro (3½) ||align=center | 1–0 
|-
| Nils Grandelius (4½) || Alireza Firouzja (6) ||align=center | ½–½  
|-
| Maxime Vachier-Lagrave (3) || Alexander Donchenko (3) ||align=center | 1–0  
|-
| Anish Giri (6) || Radosław Wojtaszek (3½) ||align=center | 1–0 
|-
|colspan=7 style="background:#cccccc;" | Round 11 – 29 January 2021
|-
| Aryan Tari (4) || Andrey Esipenko (6½) ||align=center | 1–0  
|-
| Alireza Firouzja (6½) || Fabiano Caruana (6½) ||align=center | ½–½  
|-
| Jorden van Foreest (6) || Pentala Harikrishna (5) ||align=center | 1–0
|-
| Magnus Carlsen (5½) || Anish Giri (7) ||align=center | ½–½
|-
| David Antón Guijarro (3½) || Nils Grandelius (5) ||align=center | ½–½ 
|-
| Alexander Donchenko (3) || Jan-Krzysztof Duda (4) ||align=center | ½–½ 
|-
| Radosław Wojtaszek (3½) || Maxime Vachier-Lagrave (4) ||align=center | ½–½  
|-
|colspan=7 style="background:#cccccc;" | Round 12 – 30 January 2021
|-
| Radosław Wojtaszek (4) || Magnus Carlsen (6) ||align=center | ½–½  
|-
| Maxime Vachier-Lagrave (6) ||  ||align=center | ½–½  
|-
| Nils Grandelius (5½) || Aryan Tari (5) ||align=center | ½–½  
|-
| Andrey Esipenko (6½) || Jorden van Foreest (7) ||align=center | ½–½
|-
| Fabiano Caruana (7) || David Antón Guijarro (4) ||align=center | ½–½
|-
| Pentala Harikrishna (5) || Alexander Donchenko (3½) ||align=center | 1–0
|-
| Anish Giri (7½) || Alireza Firouzja (7) ||align=center | ½–½  
|-
|colspan=4 style="background:#cccccc;" | Round 13 – 31 January 2021
|-
| Alireza Firouzja (7½) || Radosław Wojtaszek (4½) ||align=center | ½–½  
|-
| Jan-Krzysztof Duda (5) || Pentala Harikrishna (6) ||align=center | ½–½  
|-
| Alexander Donchenko (3½) || Andrey Esipenko (7) ||align=center | 0–1
|-
| Aryan Tari (5½) || Fabiano Caruana (7½) ||align=center | ½–½
|-
| Jorden van Foreest (7½) || Nils Grandelius (6) ||align=center | 1–0
|-
| Magnus Carlsen (6½) || Maxime Vachier-Lagrave (6½) ||align=center | 1–0
|-
|  || Anish Giri (8) ||align=center | ½–½  
|-
|}

References

External links

Tata Steel Chess Tournament
2021 in chess
2021 in Dutch sport
January 2021 sports events in Europe